St. Clair County is a county located in the central portion of the U.S. state of Alabama. As of the 2020 census, the population was 91,103. It has two county seats: Ashville and Pell City. It is one of two counties in Alabama, and one of 33 in the United States, with more than one county seat. Its name is in honor of General Arthur St. Clair, an officer in the French and Indian War. St. Clair County is included in the Birmingham-Hoover, Alabama Metropolitan Statistical Area.

History
St. Clair County was established on November 20, 1818, by the Alabama Territory legislature by splitting the area from Shelby County.  The county seat was incorporated and named "Ashville" in honor of John Ash. In 1836, a portion of St. Clair County was separated to establish Cherokee County and DeKalb County. In 1866, after the Civil War, a northeast section of the county was used to create Etowah County. 

Due to the relatively high terrain of the far southern end of the Appalachian Mountains which divides the county in a northeast–southwest orientation, and the difficulty of communication and administration from either side of the county to the other, a second county seat was established in Pell City to better provide administration and services to the southeast side of the county.

In 2019, St. Clair County became the seventh county in Alabama to adopt its own flag.

Geography

Adjacent counties
Etowah County - northeast
Calhoun County - east
Talladega County - southeast
Shelby County - southwest
Jefferson County - west
Blount County - northwest

Transportation

Major highways

 Interstate 20
 Interstate 59
 U.S. Route 11
 U.S. Route 78
 U.S. Route 231
 U.S. Route 411
 State Route 23
 State Route 34
 State Route 144
 State Route 174

Rail
Alabama and Tennessee River Railway
Norfolk Southern Railway

Historically, the Southern Railway ran several daily passenger trains, including the Kansas City-Florida Special and an Atlanta-Birmingham section of the Piedmont Limited, making stops in Pell City. The Sunnyland made signal stops as well. The last trains made stops in 1967. Today, the nearest passenger service is Amtrak's Crescent in Anniston 30.6 miles to the east.

Demographics

2000 census
At the 2000 census there were 64,742 people, 24,143 households, and 18,445 families living in the county.  The population density was 102 people per square mile (39/km2).  There were 27,303 housing units at an average density of 43 per square mile (17/km2).  The racial makeup of the county was 90.03% White, 8.13% Black or African American, 0.37% Native American, 0.17% Asian, 0.03% Pacific Islander, 0.41% from other races, and 0.85% from two or more races.  1.06% of the population were Hispanic or Latino of any race.
In 2000 the largest ancestry groups in St. Clair county were: 
 English 71%
 Irish 13.1%
 African 8.13%
 German 8%
 Scots-Irish 3.5%
 Dutch 2.4%
 Scottish 2%

Of the 24,143 households 35.10% had children under the age of 18 living with them, 62.80% were married couples living together, 10.00% had a female householder with no husband present, and 23.60% were non-families. 20.80% of households were one person and 8.20% were one person aged 65 or older.  The average household size was 2.60 and the average family size was 3.01.

The age distribution was 25.40% under the age of 18, 7.90% from 18 to 24, 30.70% from 25 to 44, 24.30% from 45 to 64, and 11.70% 65 or older.  The median age was 36 years. For every 100 females, there were 101.80 males.  For every 100 females age 18 and over, there were 98.80 males.

The median household income was $37,285 and the median family income was $43,152. Males had a median income of $33,914 versus $24,433 for females. The per capita income for the county was $17,960.  About 9.60% of families and 12.10% of the population were below the poverty line, including 15.20% of those under age 18 and 12.60% of those age 65 or over.

2010 census
At the 2010 census there were 83,593 people, 31,624 households, and 23,364 families living in the county. The population density was 132 people per square mile (51/km2). There were 35,541 housing units at an average density of 56 per square mile (22/km2). The racial makeup of the county was 88.2% White, 8.6% Black or African American, 0.3% Native American, 0.6% Asian, 0.1% Pacific Islander, 0.9% from other races, and 1.3% from two or more races. 2.1% of the population were Hispanic or Latino of any race.
Of the 31,624 households 30.7% had children under the age of 18 living with them, 58.3% were married couples living together, 11.2% had a female householder with no husband present, and 26.1% were non-families. 22.5% of households were one person and 8.5% were one person aged 65 or older. The average household size was 2.58 and the average family size was 3.02.

The age distribution was 23.7% under the age of 18, 7.8% from 18 to 24, 27.8% from 25 to 44, 27.6% from 45 to 64, and 13.1% 65 or older. The median age was 38.6 years. For every 100 females, there were 100.5 males. For every 100 females age 18 and over, there were 102.3 males.

The median household income was $48,837 and the median family income was $56,107. Males had a median income of $43,287 versus $32,843 for females. The per capita income for the county was $22,192. About 8.3% of families and 10.6% of the population were below the poverty line, including 13.2% of those under age 18 and 9.5% of those age 65 or over.

2020 census

As of the 2020 United States census, there were 91,103 people, 32,829 households, and 25,409 families residing in the county.

Government

Communities

Cities
Ashville (county seat)
Leeds (mostly in Jefferson County and Shelby County)
Margaret
Moody
Pell City (county seat)
Springville
Trussville (mostly in Jefferson County)

Towns

Argo (partly in Jefferson County)
Odenville
Ragland
Riverside
Steele
Vincent (partly in Shelby County and Talladega County)

Unincorporated communities

 Acmar
 Cooks Springs
 Cropwell
 Hill Number 1
 New London
 Pinedale Shores
 Prescott
 Sportsmen Lake
 St. Clair Springs
 Wattsville
 Whitney

Former Towns

 Branchville (now a neighborhood in Odenville)

Places of interest
St. Clair County is home to Logan Martin Lake. It also contains Horse Pens 40, a private outdoor park on top of Chandler Mountain.

See also
National Register of Historic Places listings in St. Clair County, Alabama
Properties on the Alabama Register of Landmarks and Heritage in St. Clair County, Alabama

References

External links

Official Site

 

 
1818 establishments in Alabama Territory
Populated places established in 1818
Birmingham metropolitan area, Alabama
Counties of Appalachia